The Russian George the Victorious  is a bullion coin issued in gold and silver by the Central Bank of Russia. Mintage began in 2006 with quarter-troy ounce (7.78g) gold coins with a face value of 50 rubles and later in 2009 a one-troy ounce silver coin was introduced with a face value of 3 rubles.  Since then, tenth, half, and one-troy ounce gold coins have been minted.

Background

Saint George was a Roman soldier and a member of the Praetorian Guard for Roman emperor Diocletian who died in 303 AD.  He was sentenced to death for refusing to recant his Christian faith.  He was a Great Martyr for the Eastern Orthodox Church and a highly revered saint in both the Western and Eastern Christian churches.  He is the patron saint for Moscow, England, Georgia, and Ethiopia.  The legend of Saint George and the Dragon tells the story of Saint George slaying a dragon and saving a princess that was going to be sacrificed to the dragon.  Images and sculptures of the legend have been produced since at least the 11th century.

The reverses of the coins have an image of Saint George slaying the dragon, as does the British sovereign coin.

Design

The coin was designed and sculpted by A. V. Baklanov and minted at the Saint Petersburg Mint and the Moscow Mint. The 2006-2016 obverse features the emblem of the Central Bank of Russia—a double-headed eagle with wings down.  This emblem was the same one used by the Russian Republic in 1917.  Both obverses are inscribed with "БАНК РОССИИ" (Bank of Russia), "ПЯТЬДЕСЯТ РУБЛЕЙ" (Fifty rubles), indications of the precious metal content and its fineness, and the year of issue followed by the mint mark.  M is the mint mark for the Moscow Mint and C-П is for the St. Petersburg Mint.  From 2017 forward, The double-headed eagle version was replaced with the current Coat of arms of Russia.  The top of the coin is inscribed with "РОССИЙСКАЯ ФЕДЕРАЦИЯ" (Russian Federation).  This version of the obverse was designed by E. V. Kramskaya.

Gold

Gold George the Victorious coins were first issued on February 1, 2006.

Gold in proof quality

In August 2012, the Central Bank of the Russian Federation issued two special coins under "Saint George the Victorious" title. One coin has denomination "50 rubles" minted in 99.9% purity, and contains not less than 7.78 grams of fine gold. Unlike traditional 50 rubles Saint George the Victorious, the coin is minted in proof quality.  Another coin has "100 rubles" denomination, features 99.9% purity, contains not less than 15.55 gram of fine gold. The coin has the same design as 50 rubles Saint George the Victorious coins (except denomination on the obverse) but greater diameter and thickness. There are 240 corrugations on the edge of the coin (134 corrugations are on the edge of 50 rubles coins). The coin is also minted in proof quality.

Higher prices (10-20% over uncirculated competitors of the same gold content), low mintages (10 thousand pieces of each denomination were issued) and a special care of proof coin handling turn Gold Saint George the Victorious in proof quality coins into numismatic items (commemorative coins) rather than means of a straightforward investment in gold coins.

Silver

Silver George the Victorious coins were first issued on January 11, 2009.

See also
 Bullion
 Bullion coins
 Gold as an investment
 Inflation hedge
 List of commemorative coins of Russia (2009)
 Silver as an investment

Notes

Saint George and the Dragon
Bullion coins of Russia
Gold bullion coins
Silver bullion coins